William Calvert (1839 – 10 February 1894) was a New Zealand cricketer. He played in two first-class matches for Canterbury from 1865 to 1868.

See also
 List of Canterbury representative cricketers

References

External links
 

1839 births
1894 deaths
New Zealand cricketers
Canterbury cricketers
Cricketers from Sunderland